La maestra enamorada is a 1961 Argentine film.

Cast
  Lolita Torres....María Elena Sánchez
  Alejandro Rey....Raúl Ledesma, an engineer
  Marcos Zucker....Ricardo Pereira
  Héctor Calcaño....minister of Educación
  Laura Hernández....minister's wife
  María del Pilar Lebrón....mother of María Elena
  María Armand....Aurelia
  Eloísa Cañizares....bursar
  Mateo Martínez
  Aldo Braga....builder employee
  Ricardo de Rosas
  Ridi Da Silva
  Julián R. Ros
  Sandra Castel
  Antonio Reales

External links
 

1961 films
1960s Spanish-language films
Argentine black-and-white films
1960s Argentine films